Dazzling Killmen was an American math rock band from the St. Louis, Missouri area. Formed in 1990, the group issued four singles and two full-lengths before officially ending in 1995, with a majority of it released through the independent label Skin Graft Records. Taking influence from hardcore punk and jazz music, the band has been noted by critics to have helped influence genres such as math rock and post-metal.

Biography
The group, named after a character from Lucas Samaras' "Crude Delights", formed in 1990, and was composed of jazz students—drummer Blake Fleming, bassist Darin Gray, vocalist/guitarist Nick Sakes, and later on guitarist Tim Garrigan, who joined the group initially as a guest musician for the "Medicine Man" 7-inch single. Gray, Fleming, and Garrigan all previously performed in their school band in high school. The group has named bands such as Ultraman, Black Flag, Minutemen, Captain Beefheart, Big Black, Miles Davis, and John Coltrane influences for their personal sound.

With their early singles and 1992 debut LP Dig Out the Switch, Dazzling Killmen caught the attention of the Chicago-based noise rock label Skin Graft Records, who proceeded to release the band's next few singles as well as their second and final full-length Face of Collapse. The group would later break up in the fall of 1995, immediately prior to a planned tour of Japan with Jim O'Rourke.

Today, its members are better-known for their later projects - Nick Sakes has been in bands Colossamite, Sicbay, and xaddax. Darin Gray was in You Fantastic!, Grand Ulena, Brise-Glace, and has performed and recorded with Jim O'Rourke and with Glenn Kotche in On Fillmore. Blake Fleming was in Laddio Bolocko, The Mars Volta and Electric Turn to Me. Tim Garrigan, now based in Brooklyn, is in Skryptor and a solo artist.

Legacy 
Dazzling Killmen has been cited as an influence by musicians such as Ben Weinman of The Dillinger Escape Plan, Jes Steineger of Coalesce, Mike Taylor of Pg. 99, KEN mode, Knut, and The Nation Blue.

The group's music has been stated to of helped influence the development of multiple genres of music, with Brad Cohen writing for Clryvnt stating that the band "helped usher in myriad movements, including math rock, math metal and progcore, all the while defying classification." Robin Jahdi named Face of Collapse as one of the best post-metal albums ever released, also stating that Dazzling Killmen "were ostensibly noise rock" and that they had left behind a "fantastic – if largely unknown – legacy in the form of [Face of Collapse]." In 2013, Spin magazine named Blake Fleming as among the 100 best drummers in alternative music.

Discography

Albums
Dig Out the Switch CD/LP (1992, Intellectual Convulsion Records)
Face of Collapse CD/LP (1994, Skin Graft Records)

Singles
"Numb/Bottom Feeder" 7" (1990, Sawtooth Records)
"Torture/Ghost Limb" 7" (1991, Crime Life Records)
"Mother's Day Split" 7" (1991, Skin Graft/Sluggo Records)
"Medicine Me" / "Poptones" 7" + Comic Set (1993, Skin Graft Records)

Live albums
Lounge Ax CS (1993, Skin Graft Records)

Compilation albums
Recuerda CD (1996, Skin Graft Records)

References

External links
 Skin Graft Records Page for the Dazzling Killmen
[ Allmusic entry]

Musical groups established in 1990
Musical groups disestablished in 1995
Musical groups from St. Louis
Math rock groups
American post-hardcore musical groups